Herbert Cowell (1858 - 1943) was an architect who lived in Joliet, Illinois. He designed residences in Plainfield, Illinois. He also worked in Huntsville, Alabama for several years before returning to Illinois.

He lived in Huntsville from about 1900 until 1904. Edgar Lee Love began his career as an assistant to Cowell in Huntsville.

Work

Huntsville, Alabama
 Van Valkenburg House at 501 Franklin Street
Sscond East Clinton Street School (demolished)
Struve-Hay commercial building at Jefferson and Holmes streets

Illinois
Vernette Wraith House (1924), a 1-story tan brick Craftsman / Prairie style bungalow in Joliet
609 Western Avenue in Joliet
Struve-Hay Building, 117-123 N. Jefferson Street in Huntsville, Alabama. NRHP listed
603 Franklin Street in Huntsville
Fletcher Lowe House 210 Williams

See also
Twickenham Historic District
Old Town Historic District (Huntsville, Alabama)

References

1858 births
1943 deaths
20th-century American architects
Architects from Illinois
Architects from Alabama
People from Joliet, Illinois
People from Huntsville, Alabama